The Bayou Music Center (originally known as the Aerial Theater) is an indoor theater owned by Live Nation and located in Houston, Texas, United States. The theater is located at the Bayou Place entertainment complex in Downtown Houston.

Naming history
Aerial Theater 
Verizon Wireless Theater 
Bayou Music Center 
Revention Music Center

See also

House of Blues

References

External links
 Official website

Music venues in Houston
Downtown Houston
Esports venues in Texas